The South Slavic languages are one of three branches of the Slavic languages. There are approximately 30 million speakers, mainly in the Balkans. These are separated geographically from speakers of the other two Slavic branches (West and East) by a belt of German, Hungarian and Romanian speakers.

History 

The first South Slavic language to be written (also the first attested Slavic language) was the variety of the Eastern South Slavic spoken in Thessaloniki, now called Old Church Slavonic, in the ninth century. It is retained as a liturgical language in Slavic Orthodox churches in the form of various local Church Slavonic traditions.

Classification 
The South Slavic languages constitute a dialect continuum. Serbian, Croatian, Bosnian, and Montenegrin constitute a single dialect within this continuum.
Eastern
 Bulgarian – (ISO 639-1 code: bg; ISO 639-2 code: bul; SIL code: bul; Linguasphere: 53-AAA-hb)
 Macedonian – (ISO 639-1 code: mk; ISO 639-2(B) code: mac; ISO 639-2(T) code: mkd; SIL code: mkd; Linguasphere: 53-AAA-ha)
 Old Church Slavonic (extinct) –  (ISO 639-1 code: cu; ISO 639-2 code: chu; SIL code: chu; Linguasphere: 53-AAA-a)
 Transitional
Torlakian

 Slovene (ISO 639-1 code: sl; ISO 639-2 code: slv; ISO 639-3 code:  slv; Linguasphere: 53-AAA-f)
 Kajkavian (ISO 639-3 code:  kjv)
 Chakavian (ISO 639-3 code:  ckm) 

Serbo-Croatian/Shtokavian (ISO 639-1 code: sh; ISO 639-2/3 code: hbs; SIL code: scr; Linguasphere: 53-AAA-g).There are four national standard languages based on the Eastern Herzegovinian dialect:
 Serbian (ISO 639-1 code: sr; ISO 639-2/3 code: srp; SIL code: srp)
 Croatian (ISO 639-1 code: hr; ISO 639-2/3 code: hrv; SIL code: hrv)
 Bosnian (ISO 639-1 code: bs; ISO 639-2/3 code: bos; SIL code: bos)
 Montenegrin (ISO 639-2/3 code: cnr; SIL code: cnr)

Linguistic prehistory 
The Slavic languages are part of the Balto-Slavic group, which belongs to the Indo-European language family. The South Slavic languages have been considered a genetic node in Slavic studies: defined by a set of phonological, morphological and lexical innovations (isoglosses) which separate it from the Western and Eastern Slavic groups. That view, however, has been challenged in recent decades (see below).

Some innovations encompassing all South Slavic languages are shared with the Eastern Slavic group, but not the Western Slavic. These include:
 Consistent application of Slavic second palatalization before Proto-Slavic *v
 Loss of *d and *t before Proto-Slavic *l
 Merger of Proto-Slavic *ś (resulting from the second and third palatalization) with *s

This is illustrated in the following table:

Several isoglosses have been identified which are thought to represent exclusive common innovations in the South Slavic language group. They are prevalently phonological in character, whereas morphological and syntactical isoglosses are much fewer in number.  list the following phonological isoglosses:

 Proto-Slavic *ę > 
 Proto-Slavic *y > , merging with the reflex of Proto-Slavic *i
 Proto-Slavic syllabic liquids *r̥ and *l̥ were retained, but *l̥ was subsequently lost in all the daughter languages with different outputs (>  in Serbo-Croatian, > vowel+ or +vowel in Slovene, Bulgarian and Macedonian), and *r̥ became  in Bulgarian. This development was identical to the loss of yer after a liquid consonant.
 Hardening of palatals and dental affricates; e.g. š' > š, č' > č, c' > c.
 South Slavic form of liquid metathesis (CoRC > CRaC, CoLC > CLaC etc.)

Most of these are not exclusive in character, however, and are shared with some languages of the Eastern and Western Slavic language groups (in particular, Central Slovakian dialects). On that basis,  argues that South Slavic exists strictly as a geographical grouping, not forming a true genetic clade; in other words, there was never a proto-South Slavic language or a period in which all South Slavic dialects exhibited an exclusive set of extensive phonological, morphological or lexical changes (isoglosses) peculiar to them. Furthermore, Matasović argues, there was never a period of cultural or political unity in which Proto-South-Slavic could have existed during which Common South Slavic innovations could have occurred. Several South-Slavic-only lexical and morphological patterns which have been proposed have been postulated to represent common Slavic archaisms, or are shared with some Slovakian or Ukrainian dialects.

The South Slavic dialects form a dialectal continuum stretching from today's southern Austria to southeast Bulgaria. On the level of dialectology, they are divided into Western South Slavic (Slovene and Serbo-Croatian dialects) and Eastern South Slavic (Bulgarian and Macedonian dialects); these represent separate migrations into the Balkans and were once separated by intervening Hungarian, Romanian, and Albanian populations; as these populations were assimilated, Eastern and Western South Slavic fused with Torlakian as a transitional dialect. On the other hand, the breakup of the Ottoman and Austro-Hungarian Empires, followed by formation of nation-states in the 19th and 20th centuries, led to the development and codification of standard languages. Standard Slovene, Bulgarian, and Macedonian are based on distinct dialects. The Bosnian, Croatian, Montenegrin, and Serbian standard variants of the pluricentric Serbo-Croatian are based on the same dialect (Shtokavian). Thus, in most cases national and ethnic borders do not coincide with dialectal boundaries.

Note: Due to the differing political status of languages/dialects and different historical contexts, the classifications are arbitrary to some degree.

Dialectal classification 

South Slavic languages
 Southeastern
 Bulgarian dialects
 Eastern Bulgarian dialects
 Western Bulgarian dialects
 Macedonian dialects
 Northern
 Western/Northwestern
 Eastern
 Southeastern
 Southwestern
 Transitional (Torlakian)
 Transitional Bulgarian dialects in western Bulgaria
 Gora dialect in southern Kosovo, western North Macedonia and northeast Albania
 Prizren-Timok dialect in southeast Serbia and eastern Kosovo 
 Karashevsk dialect in western Romania
 
 Shtokavian dialects (Serbo-Croatian)
 Šumadija–Vojvodina (Ekavian, Neo-Shtokavian): Serbia
 Smederevo–Vršac (Ekavian, Old-Shtokavian): east-central Serbia
 Kosovo–Resava (Ekavian, Old-Shtokavian): north Kosovo, eastern central Serbia
 Zeta–Raška (Ijekavian, Old-Shtokavian), in south and east Montenegro and southwest Serbia
 Eastern Herzegovinian (Ijekavian, Neo-Shtokavian), Croatia, Bosnia, Serbia, Montenegro
 East-Bosnian (Ijekavian, Old-Shtokavian), in central and northern Bosnia
 Slavonian (mixed yat, Old-Shtokavian), in eastern Croatia
 Younger Ikavian (Ikavian) with 3 subdialects — Dalmatian, Danubian (Bunjevac dialect), and Littoral-Lika: in Dalmatia, central Bosnia, northern Serbia, southern Hungary (incl. Budapest) 
 Prizren–Timok (Ekavian, Old-Shtokavian), in southeast Serbia and south Kosovo
 Chakavian dialects
 Buzet subdialect: Croatia
 Western Chakavian subdialect: Croatia
 Southwestern Istrian subdialect: Croatia
 Northern Chakavian subdialect: Croatia
 Southern Chakavian subdialect: Croatia
 Lastovo subdialect: Croatia
 Kajkavian dialects, in Croatia
 Zagorje–Međimurje subdialect
 Križevci–Podravina subdialect
 Turopolje–Posavina subdialect
 Prigorski subdialect
 Donja Sutla subdialect
 Goranski subdialect
 Slovene dialects  
 Littoral Slovene: Primorsko; west Slovenia and Adriatic
 Rovte Slovene: Rovtarsko; between Littoral and Carniolan
 Upper and Lower Carniolan: Gorenjsko and Dolenjsko; central; basis of Standard Slovene
 Styrian: Štajersko; eastern Slovenia
 Pannonian or Prekmurje dialect: Panonsko; far eastern Slovenia 
 Carinthian: Koroško; far north and northwest Slovenia
 Resian: Rozajansko; Italy, west of Carinthian
Other
 Burgenland Croatian (mixed), minority in Austria and Hungary

Southeast Slavic languages 

The dialects that form the eastern group of South Slavic, spoken mostly in Bulgaria and Macedonia and adjacent areas in neighbouring countries (such as the Bessarabian Bulgarians in Ukraine), share a number of characteristics that set them apart from other Slavic languages:
 the existence of a definite article (e.g. книга, book – книгата, the book, време, time – времето, the time)
 a near complete lack of noun cases
 the lack of a verb infinitive
 the formation of comparative forms of adjectives formed with the prefix по- (e.g. добър, по-добър (Bulg.)/добар, подобар (Maced.) – good, better) 
 a future tense formed by the present form of the verb preceded by ще/ќе
 the existence of a renarrative mood (e.g. Той ме видял. (Bulg.)/Тој ме видел. (Maced.) – He supposedly saw me. Compare with Той ме видя./Тој ме виде. – He saw me.)
Bulgarian and Macedonian share some of their unusual characteristics with other languages in the Balkans, notably Greek and Albanian (see Balkan sprachbund).

Bulgarian dialects 

Eastern Bulgarian dialects
Western Bulgarian dialects (includes Torlakian dialects)

Macedonian dialects 

 Southeastern Macedonian dialects
 Northern Macedonian (including three Torlakian dialects)
 Western Macedonian dialects

Torlakian dialect in Serbian 
 Torlakian dialects in southeast Serbia are only spoken and unstandardized, as Serbian literary language only recognizes the Shtokavian form (as other Serbo-Croatian languages)

Transitional South Slavic languages

Torlakian dialects 

Torlakian dialects are spoken in southeastern Serbia, northern North Macedonia, western Bulgaria, southeastern Kosovo, and pockets of western Romania; it is considered transitional between the Western and Eastern groups of South Slavic languages. Torlakian is thought to fit together with Bulgarian and Macedonian into the Balkan sprachbund, an area of linguistic convergence caused by long-term contact rather than genetic relation. Because of this some researchers tend to classify it as Southeast Slavic.

Southwest Slavic languages

History 
Each of these primary and secondary dialectal units breaks down into subdialects and accentological isoglosses by region. In the past (and currently, in isolated areas), it was not uncommon for individual villages to have their own words and phrases. However, during the 20th century the local dialects have been influenced by Štokavian standards through mass media and public education and much "local speech" has been lost (primarily in areas with larger populations). With the breakup of Yugoslavia, a rise in national awareness has caused individuals to modify their speech according to newly established standard-language guidelines. The wars have caused large migrations, changing the ethnic (and dialectal) picture of some areas—especially in Bosnia and Herzegovina, but also in central Croatia and Serbia (Vojvodina in particular). In some areas, it is unclear whether location or ethnicity is the dominant factor in the dialect of the speaker. Because of this the speech patterns of some communities and regions are in a state of flux, and it is difficult to determine which dialects will die out entirely. Further research over the next few decades will be necessary to determine the changes made in the dialectical distribution of this language group.

Shtokavian dialects 

The eastern Herzegovinian dialect is the basis of the Bosnian, Croatian, Montenegrin, and Serbian standard variants of the pluricentric Serbo-Croatian.

Slavomolisano 

The Slavomolisano dialect is spoken in three villages of the Italian region of Molise by the descendants of South Slavs who migrated from the eastern Adriatic coast during the 15th century. Because this group left the rest of their people so long ago, their diaspora language is distinct from the standard language and influenced by Italian. However, their dialect retains archaic features lost by all other Štokavian dialects after the 15th century, making it a useful research tool.

Chakavian dialects 

Chakavian is spoken in the western, central, and southern parts of Croatia—mainly in Istria, the Kvarner Gulf, Dalmatia and inland Croatia (Gacka and Pokupje, for example). The Chakavian reflex of proto-Slavic yat is i or sometimes e (rarely as (i)je), or mixed (Ekavian–Ikavian). Many dialects of Chakavian preserved significant number of Dalmatian words, but also have many loanwords from Venetian, Italian, Greek and other Mediterranean languages.

Example: Ča je, je, tako je vavik bilo, ča će bit, će bit, a nekako će već bit!

Burgenland Croatian 

This dialect is spoken primarily in the federal state of Burgenland in Austria and nearby areas in Vienna, Slovakia, and Hungary by descendants of Croats who migrated there during the 16th century. This dialect (or family of dialects) differs from standard Croatian, since it has been heavily influenced by German and Hungarian. It has properties of all three major dialectal groups in Croatia, since the migrants did not all come from the same area. The linguistic standard is based on a Chakavian dialect, and (like all Chakavian dialects) is characterized by very conservative grammatical structures: for example, it preserves case endings lost in the Shtokavian base of standard Croatian. At most 100,000 people speak Burgenland Croatian and almost all are bilingual in German. Its future is uncertain, but there is movement to preserve it. It has official status in six districts of Burgenland, and is used in some schools in Burgenland and neighboring western parts of Hungary.

Kajkavian dialects 

Kajkavian is mostly spoken in northern and northwest Croatia near the Hungarian and Slovene borders—chiefly around the towns of Zagreb, Varaždin, Čakovec, Koprivnica, Petrinja, Delnice and so on. Its reflex of yat is primarily , rarely diphthongal ije). This differs from that of the Ekavian accent; many Kajkavian dialects distinguish a closed e—nearly ae (from yat)—and an open e (from the original e). It lacks several palatals (ć, lj, nj, dž) found in the Shtokavian dialect, and has some loanwords from the nearby Slovene dialects and German (chiefly in towns).

Example: Kak je, tak je; tak je navek bilo, kak bu tak bu, a bu vre nekak kak bu!

Slovene dialects 

Slovene is mainly spoken in Slovenia. Spoken Slovene is often considered to have at least 37 dialects. The exact number of dialects is open to debate, ranging from as many as 50 to merely 7. However, this latter number usually refers to dialect groups, some of which are more heterogeneous than others. The various dialects can be so different from each other that a speaker of one dialect may have a very difficult time understanding a speaker of another, particularly if they belong to different regional groups. Some dialects spoken in southern Slovenia transition into Chakavian or Kajkavian Serbo-Croatian, while the transition from eastern dialects to Kajkavian is general, with cases of essentially the same linguistic variety spoken on both sides of the border (this is particularly true for the upper course of the Kupa and Sutla rivers).

Comparison 
The table below compares grammatical and phonological innovations. The similarity of Kajkavian and Slovene is apparent.

Grammar

Eastern–Western division 

In broad terms, the Eastern dialects of South Slavic (Bulgarian and Macedonian) differ most from the Western dialects in the following ways:

 The Eastern dialects have almost completely lost their noun declensions, and have become entirely analytic.
 The Eastern dialects have developed definite-article suffixes similar to the other languages in the Balkan Sprachbund.
 The Eastern dialects have lost the infinitive; thus, the first-person singular (for Bulgarian) or the third-person singular (for Macedonian) are considered the main part of a verb. Sentences which would require an infinitive in other languages are constructed through a clause in Bulgarian, искам да ходя (iskam da hodya), "I want to go" (literally, "I want that I go").

Apart from these three main areas there are several smaller, significant differences:

 The Western dialects have three genders in both singular and plural (Slovene has dual—see below), while the Eastern dialects only have them in the singular—for example, Serbian  on (he), ona (she), ono (it), oni (they, masc), one (they, fem), ona (they, neut); the Bulgarian te (they) and Macedonian тие (tie, 'they') covers the entire plural.
 Inheriting a generalization of another demonstrative as a base form for the third-person pronoun which already occurred in late Proto-Slavic, standard literary Bulgarian (like Old Church Slavonic) does not use the Slavic "on-/ov-" as base forms like on, ona, ono, oni (he, she, it, they), and ovaj, ovde (this, here), but uses "to-/t-"based pronouns like toy, tya, to, te, and tozi, tuk (it only retains onzi – "that" and its derivatives). Western Bulgarian dialects and Macedonian have "ov-/on-" pronouns, and sometimes use them interchangeably.
 All dialects of Serbo-Croatian contain the concept of "any" – e.g. Serbian neko "someone"; niko "no one"; iko "anyone". All others lack the last, and make do with some- or no- constructions instead.

Divisions within Western dialects 

 While Serbian, Bosnian and Croatian Shtokavian dialects have basically the same grammar, its usage is very diverse. While all three languages are relatively highly inflected, the further east one goes the more likely it is that analytic forms are used – if not spoken, at least in the written language. A very basic example is:
 Croatian – hoću ići – "I want – to go"
 Serbian – hoću da idem – "I want – that – I go"
 Slovene has retained the proto-Slavic dual number (which means that it has nine personal pronouns in the third person) for both nouns and verbs. For example:
 nouns: volk (wolf) → volkova (two wolves) → volkovi (some wolves)
 verbs: hodim (I walk) → hodiva (the two of us walk) → hodimo (we walk)

Divisions within Eastern dialects 

 In Macedonian, the perfect is largely based on the verb "to have" (as in other Balkan languages like Greek and Albanian, and in English), as opposed to the verb "to be", which is used as the auxiliary in all other Slavic languages (see also Macedonian verbs):
 Macedonian – imam videno – I have seen (imam – "to have")
 Bulgarian – vidyal sum – I have seen (sum – "to be")
In Macedonian there are three types of definite article (base definite form, definite noun near the speaker and definite noun far from the speaker).
дете (dete, 'а child')
детето (deteto, 'the child')
детево (detevo, 'this child [near me]')
детено (deteno, 'that child [over there]')

Writing systems 

Languages to the west of Serbia use the Latin script, whereas those to the east and south use Cyrillic. Serbian officially uses the Cyrillic script, though commonly Latin and Cyrillic are used equally. Most newspapers are written in Cyrillic and most magazines are in Latin; books written by Serbian authors are written in Cyrillic, whereas books translated from foreign authors are usually in Latin, other than languages that already use Cyrillic, most notably Russian. On television, writing as part of a television programme is usually in Cyrillic, but advertisements are usually in Latin. The division is partly based on religion – Serbia, Montenegro, Bulgaria and Macedonia (which use Cyrillic) are Orthodox countries, whereas Croatia and Slovenia (which use Latin) are Catholic. The Bosnian language, used by the Muslim Bosniaks, also uses Latin, but in the past used Bosnian Cyrillic. The Glagolitic alphabet was also used in the Middle Ages (most notably in Bulgaria, Macedonia and Croatia), but gradually disappeared.

See also 
 Abstand and ausbau languages
 Comparison of standard Bosnian, Croatian, Montenegrin and Serbian
 Language secessionism in Serbo-Croatian
 Mutual intelligibility
 Outline of Slavic history and culture
 Pluricentric Serbo-Croatian language
 South Slavic dialect continuum
 Standard language
 Yat

Notes

Sources

Further reading

External links